Sara Malakul Grove is a Thai-American actress and former supermodel. She has appeared in numerous Thai and Hollywood films. She most notably featured in the Kickboxer action film franchise across several films as the female lead.

Early life
Malakul Lane was born in Guam to a Scottish father, Alastair Lane, and a Thai mother, Thapthim Malakul na Ayudhaya. Through her mother, she is a member of the Chakri dynasty, the current reigning dynasty of Thailand. Her mother's father, Mom Luang Pikthip Malakul, was a diplomat, including ambassador of Thailand to Myanmar and the United Kingdom; Pikthip Malakul's grandfather was one of many children of Rama II of Siam. The family name Malakul was bestowed by King Vajiravudh on 30 May 1913, following the royal act which prescribed the use of surnames. She grew up between the United Kingdom and Bangkok, where she studied at NIST International School. She currently resides in Singapore.

Career
Malakul Lane, a method actress, started her acting career at the age of 15, transitioning from modeling after she won a role in her first TV series. She acted in Thai soap operas before moving to America.

Her first role in a Hollywood film was playing Steven Seagal's daughter in the 2003 film Belly of the Beast. She then starred in Sharktopus with Eric Roberts in 2010 and alongside Roberts and Peter Stormare in The Wayshower in 2011.

In 2016, she played a Bangkok detective who becomes the love interest of the lead character in Kickboxer: Vengeance, which was released in September 2016. She reprised the role in the sequel, Kickboxer: Retaliation, released in 2018.

Filmography

Film

Television

References

External links

Living people
American female models
American film actresses
Sara Malakul Lane
Sara Malakul Lane
Sara Malakul Lane
Guamanian actresses
21st-century American actresses
Sara Malakul Lane
Sara Malakul Lane
Sara Malakul Lane
Sara Malakul Lane
American people of Scottish descent
American people of Thai descent
Year of birth missing (living people)